Christopher David Ingram (born 5 December 1976) is a Welsh former professional footballer who played as a winger. He made eight appearances for Cardiff City in the Football League, scoring on his home debut against Mansfield Town. He later played for Merthyr Tydfil and Cambrian & Clydach Vale.

References

1976 births
Living people
Welsh footballers
Footballers from Cardiff
Cardiff City F.C. players
Merthyr Tydfil F.C. players
Cambrian & Clydach Vale B. & G.C. players
English Football League players
Association football wingers